The 1971 Hardie-Ferodo 500 was a motor race held on 3 October 1971 at the Mount Panorama Circuit just outside Bathurst in New South Wales, Australia. It was open to production vehicles competing in showroom condition, with the field divided into five classes based on the purchase price of the vehicle in Australian dollars. Although an outright winner was officially recognised, all other official awards were for class results only. The race was the 12th in  a sequence of annual "Bathurst 500" production car races dating back to the 1960 Armstrong 500. The outright winner was Allan Moffat driving a Ford XY Falcon GT-HO Phase III.

The 1971 race is perhaps best remembered for Sydney driver Bill Brown's lucky escape after the biggest single car crash in the race's history. The Falcon barrel-rolled along the fence (with two marshals lucky to escape with their lives by only just scampering out of the way) and ended upside down after 3½ rolls. Brown was lucky because his seat broke in the first roll and he was lying flat in the car as it continued rolling. Amazingly his only injuries were a grazed shin and a black eye.

1971 will also be remembered as the year that Moffat had a stray cardboard Southwark Bitter carton attached itself to the front of his GTHO for a number of laps, blocking the car's radiator. Pit boards told him of the problem and the team attempted to call Moffat in for a quick stop to remove the carton, but Moffat, seeing no change to the engine temperature and no reduction in the cars performance, waved them off and remained on the track until his scheduled pit stop with the approval of Ford Works Team manager Howard Marsden.

Class structure
Cars competed in five classes based on the purchase price of the vehicle in Australian dollars.

Class A
Class A was for cars costing less than $2,150. It was contested by Datsun 1200, Mazda 1300 and Toyota Corolla.

Class B
The $2,151 to $2,500 class had the smallest number of starters with just four cars: Datsun 1600 and Mazda Capella 1600.

Class C
The $2,501 to $3,150 class saw a mix of Ford Cortina, Ford Escort, 2.8 litre Holden Torana GTR, Honda 1300, Mazda RX-2 and Morris Cooper S.

Class D
The $3,151 to $4,350 class featured Alfa Romeo Giulia, the E38 version of the Chrysler Valiant Charger, Ford Falcon 500 and 3.0 litre Holden Torana GTR XU-1.

Class E
For cars over $4,350. Apart from a single Fiat 124S, the class consisted only of Ford Falcon GT-HO Phase IIIs.

Top 10 Qualifiers

Results

Statistics
 Pole Position - #65 Allan Moffat - 2:38.9
 Fastest Lap - #58 Bob Morris - 2:40 (lap record)
 Average Speed - 130 km/h
 Race Time of winning car - 6:09:49.5

References

External links
 1971 Race results & Official Program, www.uniquecarsandparts.com.au
 1971 Bathurst 500 images, www.autopics.com.au

Motorsport in Bathurst, New South Wales
Hardie-Ferodo 500